Pushpaka Vimana is a mythological flying palace or chariot.

Pushpaka Vimana may also refer to:

 Pushpaka Vimana (1987 film), Indian silent film
 Pushpaka Vimana (2017 film), Kannada film